Inbiocystiscus tanialeonae is a species of very small sea snail, a marine gastropod mollusk or micromollusk in the family Cystiscidae.

Distribution
This marine species occurs off Guadeloupe. It is named after Cuban conductor and composer Tania León.

References

Cystiscidae
Gastropods described in 2016
Tanialeonae